HMS Guernsey was a 50-gun fourth rate ship of the line of the Royal Navy, launched at Blackwall Yard in 1696.

She was rebuilt according to the 1706 Establishment at Woolwich Dockyard, and was relaunched on 24 October 1717. On 23 February 1737 orders were issued for Guernsey to be taken to pieces and rebuilt at Chatham to the 1733 proposals of the 1719 Establishment. She was relaunched on 11 August 1740, and remained in active service until 1769 when she was hulked.

Guernsey was sold out of the navy in 1786.

Notes

References

Lavery, Brian (2003) The Ship of the Line - Volume 1: The development of the battlefleet 1650-1850. Conway Maritime Press. .

Ships of the line of the Royal Navy
1690s ships
Ships built by the Blackwall Yard